John Georgiou (born 5 October 1975) is a former Australian rules footballer who played for St Kilda in the Australian Football League (AFL) during the 1990s.

Georgiou, recruited from Parkmore, was just 16 years and 210 days old when he made his league debut in the 1992 AFL season. St Kilda won all seven games which Georgiou played that year but he got injured and over the next three seasons could only add a further nine appearances before being delisted.
                
A member of the Greek Team of the Century, Georgiou finished his career at Frankston and won the J. J. Liston Trophy in 1999. Georgiou was appointed as an assistant coach at the Sandringham Zebras (VFL) for season 2011.

Georgiou was named the coach of the Mount Eliza Football Club for the 2014. He joined the board of the Frankston Football Club in 2016, shortly before mounting debts from previous years forced the club into administration and out of the VFL.

References

Holmesby, Russell and Main, Jim (2007). The Encyclopedia of AFL Footballers. 7th ed. Melbourne: Bas Publishing.

External links

1975 births
Living people
Australian people of Greek descent
St Kilda Football Club players
Frankston Football Club players
J. J. Liston Trophy winners
Australian rules footballers from Victoria (Australia)